Clemon Daniels Jr. (July 9, 1937 – March 23, 2019) was an American professional football player who was a halfback in the American Football League (AFL) and the National Football League (NFL).

College career
At Prairie View A&M University, he was voted to All-Conference honors during his sophomore and junior years, and captained the NAIA National Football Championship team in his senior year.

He also completed the Army Reserve Officer Training Corps (ROTC) Program at Prairie View A&M, later being a commissioned officer in the United States Army Reserve.

Professional career
Daniels was signed as a free agent in 1960 by the AFL's Dallas Texans, who, like other AFL teams recruited players from small and predominantly black colleges, which were mainly ignored by the conservative NFL.  He was on the Texans' roster for 14 games in 1960, but saw little playing time behind Abner Haynes. In 1961, he was traded to the AFL's Oakland Raiders, and spent seven years there. He was an American Football League All-Star in 1963, 1964, 1965 and 1966.

In 1963, Daniels was The Sporting News  American Football League Player of the Year, with a 5.1 yards/carry average, gaining 1,099 yards.  He was the All-Time leading rusher in the American Football League and was selected to the All-Time All-AFL Team.

Honors
He was voted into Prairie View's Hall of Fame in 1992 and the California Black Athletic Hall of Fame in 1993. He was inducted into the Texas Football Hall of Fame in 1999.

References

1937 births
2019 deaths
People from McKinney, Texas
Military personnel from Texas
Players of American football from Texas
American football running backs
American football return specialists
Prairie View A&M Panthers football players
Dallas Texans (AFL) players
Oakland Raiders players
San Francisco 49ers players
American Football League All-Star players
American Football League Most Valuable Players
American Football League rushing leaders
American Football League All-Time Team
American Football League players
United States Army officers